Claudia Carawan (born April 19, 1959, Alexandria, Virginia, United States) is an American singer-songwriter and pianist. Although she has been creating and performing music for more than 20 years, it took until 2003 before she released her debut album, Out of the Blue. It derives its sound from several styles including soul, R&B, reggae and jazz. Carawan is a cousin of the folk musician Guy Carawan.

Discography
 Out of the Blue (2003)
 Fearless (2008)
 Unfinished Business • Li’l Ronnie & The Bluebeats Featuring Claudia Carawan (2013)
 Joy Rising (2013)

References

External links
 Claudia Carawan's website

1959 births
Living people
American soul musicians
American contemporary R&B singers
Music of Richmond, Virginia
Musicians from Alexandria, Virginia
Singers from Virginia
Songwriters from Virginia
20th-century American pianists
20th-century American women pianists
21st-century American pianists
21st-century American women pianists